The Flag Officer-in-Command  (FOIC) is the overall commander and senior admiral of the Philippine Navy, the naval warfare branch of the Armed Forces of the Philippines. It is normally held by a three-star rank of Vice Admiral. He has operational control and is responsible for overall operations of the service, including the Philippine Marine Corps, and directly reports to the Chief of Staff of the Armed Forces of the Philippines.

List of Flag Officer-in-Command

Philippine Revolutionary Navy

Offshore Patrol

Philippine Navy

References

Philippines